Morning is a 2010 American drama film written by, directed by and starring Leland Orser.  The film also stars Jeanne Tripplehorn, Laura Linney and Elliott Gould.  It is Orser's directorial debut.  It is also based on Orser's 2007 short film of the same name.

Cast
Jeanne Tripplehorn as Alice Munroe
Leland Orser as Mark Munroe
Laura Linney as Dr. Goodman
Julie White as Mary
Gina Morelli as Lluvia
Kyle Chandler as Businessman
Elliott Gould as Male Dr. Goodman
Charlie McDermott as Jesse
Jason Ritter as Hotel Receptionist
Ewan Chung as Cosmetics Salesman
Katie Traina as Young Mother Tracy
Sawyer Ellis White as Boy
Lydia Blanco as Sales Clerk
Ellis Williams as Bartender
Susan Dalian as Nurse
Birdie Num Num as Dog

Production
Morning was filmed in 21 days.

Reception
The film has a 45% rating on Rotten Tomatoes.

Andrew Frisicano of Time Out gave the film two stars out of five.

References

External links
 
 

2010 films
2010 drama films
American drama films
Features based on short films
Films scored by Michael Brook
Films about grieving
2010 directorial debut films
2010s English-language films
2010s American films